William Tybard was an Oxford college head in the 15th-century. He was the second recorded President of Magdalen College, Oxford, serving from 30 Sept 1457 until his resignation on 23 August 1480.

References

Year of birth unknown
Year of death unknown
Presidents of Magdalen College, Oxford
15th-century English people